Aspiro AB was a Norwegian-based, legally Swedish-domiciled technology company founded in 1998. The company mainly provided subscription-based lossless music streaming services under its two brands, Tidal and WiMP. The company was headquartered in Norway, with additional offices in Poland, Sweden, Denmark, and Germany.

As of the end of December 2014, Aspiro's music streaming services had 500,000 paying customers.

History

The company was founded in 1998 by Jörgen Adolfsson, Christer Månsson and Klas Hallqvist. The founders knew each other from working together at Europolitan, one of Sweden's three largest mobile phone operators at the time, which was partly owned by Vodafone. It was not until Adolfsson and Månsson moved to Oslo, where they worked for Telenor Mobil's division for Value-Creating Services, they realized the changes that Wireless Application Protocol would mean for mobile communications, immediately they contacted Hallqvist, who remained in Sweden as head of quality at Europolitan, and founded Aspiro.

In May 2000, Aspiro was listed on Stockholm Stock Exchange's New Market and later in June 2001, began trading on the main list. Between 2000 and 2008, Aspiro acquired at least 13 companies which are Midab Data, InfoCreator, Mgage Systems, Picofun, Melody Interactive Solutions, Emode, Cellus, Inpoc, Boomi, Mobile Avenue, Rubberduck, Voolife and Mobile Entry. However, it wasn't until 2009 they developed their first music streaming service, which is the core business today.

On 30 January 2015 it was announced that Aspiro had received a $56 million takeover bid from Project Panther Bidco Ltd., which is indirectly owned and controlled by rapper and businessman Jay-Z. Although some minority shareholders opposed the takeover and argued that Project Panther undervalued the growth potential in their bid, the acquisition was announced and finalized on March 13 after being accepted by over 90 percent of the shareholders. WiMP merged with Tidal under the Tidal name in March 2015. Majority ownership of Aspiro was later acquired by Square Inc. in March 2021.

References

External links 
 

Jay-Z
Online music stores of Norway